Eden Lane is the first (and as of 2012 the only) openly transgender person in mainstream television broadcasting in the United States. In 2008 she became the first openly transgender journalist to cover a major political event for PBS (the Democratic National Convention). As of 2015 she is the host of In Focus with Eden Lane on Colorado Public Television, which began airing in 2009. In 2015 she was named "Best Non-Network TV Personality" by the newspaper Westword. In April of 2020 Lane joined NewsNet on assignment as Anchor of Midday Edition. 

Now Eden Lane is also the voice reading AM and Midday Headlines for Scripps National OTT.  

Eden Lane joined CPR News as a reporter in 2022 https://www.cpr.org/author/eden-lane/ 

Lane is married and has one daughter.

References

External links
 

Transgender women
LGBT people from Colorado
American television journalists
American LGBT journalists